Periagua (from Spanish piragua, in turn derived from the Carib language word for dugout) is the term formerly used in the Caribbean and the eastern seaboard of North America for a range of small craft including canoes and small sailing vessels. The term periagua overlaps, but is not synonymous with, pirogue, derived through the French language from piragua.

The original periaguas or piraguas were the dugout canoes encountered by the Spanish in the Caribbean. Small craft of greater capacity were created by splitting a dugout and inserting a plank bottom, while the freeboard was increased for sea voyages by adding planks on the sides. By the 18th century the term periagua was being applied to flat-bottomed boats, which could be 30 feet (10 m) or more long and carry up to 30 men, with one or two masts, which could also be rowed. Later in the 18th century periagua became the name for a specific type of sailing rig, with gaff rigged sails on two masts that could be easily struck, commonly with the foremast raked forward and the main mast raked back. The "periagua rig" was used on U. S. Navy gunboats on the Chesapeake Bay in the early 19th century. The term periagua was also applied to rowing scows similar to a john boat.

Periaguas were used in fishing and coastal and inter-island commerce. Early in the 18th century periaguas were used by pirates around the Bahamas, Cuba and Hispaniola. Periaguas could be rowed against the wind, useful for approaching potential victims or escaping from pursuers. Benjamin Hornigold and Sam Bellamy began their careers as pirate captains operating from periaguas.

Notes

References
Century Dictionary. Found at global-language.com
Chapelle, Howard Irving. (1951) American small sailing craft, their design, development, and construction. W. W. Norton & Company. Found at Google Books.
Woodard, Colin. (2007) The Republic of Pirates. Harcourt, Inc. 

Boat types